Frumkin is a surname. Notable people with the surname include:

Abraham Frumkin (1872–1946), Jewish anarchist
Alexander Naumovich Frumkin (1895–1976), Russian electrochemist
Amos Frumkin (born 1953), Israeli geologist
Aryeh Leib Frumkin (1845–1916), rabbi and a founder of Petah Tikvah
Gad Frumkin (1887–1960), Israeli jurist, judge on the Supreme Court of Mandatory Palestine
Gene Frumkin (1928–2007), American poet and teacher
Harold Frumkin (Frumpkin)
Heshel Shlomo Frumkin (1896–1974), Israeli economist and politician
Israel Dov Frumkin (1850–1914), Jewish journalist in Palestine
Michael Levi Frumkin (1845–1904), Jewish-American publisher
Peter Frumkin, professor and author
Sidney Frumkin (1903–1976)
Si Frumkin (1930–2009), Jewish Lithuanian-American activist
Sylvia Frumkin, pseudonym of the subject of Susan Sheehan's 1982 biography Is There No Place On Earth For Me?

Fromkin
David Fromkin (1932–2017), lawyer, historian, and author
Victoria Fromkin (1923–2000), American linguist

See also
Frumkes
Frum
Fromm (disambiguation)

References

Jewish surnames
Russian-language surnames
Yiddish-language surnames
Matronymic surnames